This was the first edition of the tournament.

Jessika Ponchet and Isabella Shinikova won the title, defeating Anna Danilina and Vivian Heisen in the final, 6–1, 6–3.

Seeds

Draw

Draw

References
Main Draw

Oeste Ladies Open - Doubles